Mazımçay (also, Mazymchay) is a village in the Balakan Rayon of Azerbaijan.  The village forms part of the municipality of Gərəkli.

References 
Notes

Sources

Populated places in Balakan District